Chihito Matsui (松井千士, born 11 November 1994) is a Japanese rugby sevens player. He competed in the men's tournament at the 2020 Summer Olympics.

References

External links
 

1994 births
Living people
Tokyo Sungoliath players
Japanese rugby union players
Yokohama Canon Eagles players
Male rugby sevens players
Olympic rugby sevens players of Japan
Rugby sevens players at the 2020 Summer Olympics
Doshisha University alumni
Sportspeople from Osaka
Asian Games medalists in rugby union
Rugby union players at the 2018 Asian Games
Asian Games silver medalists for Japan
Medalists at the 2018 Asian Games
Japan international rugby union players
Rugby union wings